Sophie Morel (born 1979) is a French mathematician, specializing in number theory. She is a CNRS directrice de recherches in mathematics at École normale supérieure de Lyon. In 2012 she received one of the ten prizes of the European Mathematical Society.

Biography 
In a 2011 interview, Morel credited a math magazine bought while in 9th grade as well as summer camps for developing her interest in mathematics  and in a 2012 interview she mentioned being a keen distance runner.
She studied in Paris at the École Normale Supérieure, graduating in 1999. In 2005 she finished her Ph.D. at the University of Paris-Sud, under the supervision of Gérard Laumon. Her thesis made progress on the Langlands program.

After her Ph.D., she was a Clay Research Fellow between 2005 and 2011. In December 2009 she was appointed as a professor of mathematics at Harvard University, becoming the first woman in mathematics to be tenured there. From 2012 to 2020, she was a professor of mathematics in Princeton University, where she was also the Henry Burchard Fine Professor in 2015. Morel moved to École Normale supérieure de Lyon as an CNRS directrice de recherches in mathematics in 2020.

Recognition
She gave an invited talk at the International Congress of Mathematicians in 2010, in the "Number Theory" section.
In 2012 she received one of the prestigious European Mathematical Society Prize for young researchers, and in May 2013 she was announced as the winner of the inaugural 2014 AWM-Microsoft Research Prize in Algebra and Number Theory.

Selected publications

References

External links 
 

20th-century French mathematicians
21st-century French mathematicians
Harvard University faculty
Princeton University faculty
1979 births
Living people
Lycée Louis-le-Grand alumni
École Normale Supérieure alumni
Number theorists
French women mathematicians
20th-century women mathematicians
21st-century women mathematicians
20th-century French women
21st-century French women